Jaysean Paige (born July 30, 1994) is a Puerto Rican professional basketball player for Mets de Guaynabo of the Baloncesto Superior Nacional (BSN). He completed his college career for West Virginia. Previously he competed for the College of Southern Idaho and Moberly Area Community College.

High school career
Paige attended Jamestown High School in Jamestown, New York, where he played football and basketball. He was named Western New York Player of the Year after leading Jamestown to a state runner-up finish as a junior. He averaged 27 points and eight rebounds per game that season. As a senior, he transferred to Perry County Central High School in Hazard, Kentucky, where he posted averages of 21 points and 6.7 rebounds per game.

College career
Paige attended the College of Southern Idaho as a freshman, where he averaged 13.6 points, 4.4 rebounds, and 2.1 steals per game. He transferred to Moberly Area Community College as a sophomore, and averaged over 21 points and four rebounds per game. in May 2014, he signed with West Virginia to play under Bob Huggins. He had considered Southern Miss, but decided not to commit after 
Donnie Tyndall was fired. As a junior, he averaged 5.6 points and 1.9 rebounds per game, starting 10 games. His season-high 18 points came against Baylor in the Big 12 Championship.

Paige was the team's sixth man as a senior, a role he relished. Against first-ranked Kansas, Paige had 26 points, five steals and four rebounds as the Mountaineers upset the Jayhawks 74-63. He scored a career-high 34 points in a 97-87 victory over Iowa State on February 22. Paige averaged 14.3 point per game in his senior season. He was named to the Second Team All-Big 12 and was the conference Sixth man Award honoree (unanimous selection).

Professional career

Oettinger Rockets Gotha (2016)
He went undrafted in the 2016 NBA Draft. He signed with Oettinger Rockets Gotha of Germany's Pro A league on August 8, 2016.

Karpoš Sokoli (2017)
On 26 November 2016, he signed with Karpoš Sokoli

Newcastle Eagles (2017–2018)
On 8 August 2017 Paige signed for the seven-time British Basketball League champions Newcastle Eagles. Paige made his debut for the Eagles on 29 September, scoring 30 points in a 148–60 victory.

Maine Red Claws (2019–2020)
For the 2019–20 season, Paige joined the Maine Red Claws of the NBA G League. On February 11, 2020, he posted 27 points, five assists, two rebounds, one steal and one block in an overtime win over the Fort Wayne Mad Ants.

Maine Celtics (2021)
On October 23, 2021, Paige signed with the Maine Celtics. He averaged 16.9 points, 2.5 rebounds, 1.6 assists, 1.1 steals per game.

Detroit Pistons (2021–2022)
On December 31, 2021, Paige signed a 10-day contract with the Detroit Pistons via the hardship exemption. He made his NBA debut on January 1.

Return to Maine (2022)
On January 7, 2022, Paige was reacquired by the Maine Celtics. However, he was waived on March 8 after suffering a season-ending injury.

Career statistics

NBA

|-
| style="text-align:left;"| 
| style="text-align:left;"| Charlotte
| 1 || 0 || 7.0 || .000 || .000 || — || 1.0 || 1.0 || .0 || .0 || .0
|- class="sortbottom"
| style="text-align:center;" colspan="2"| Career
| 1 || 0 || 7.0 || .000 || .000 || — || 1.0 || 1.0 || .0 || .0 || .0

Personal life 
Paige is the son of Lashawn Paige and Jessica Echevarria. He majored in multidisciplinary studies.

References 

1994 births
Living people
American expatriate basketball people in Germany
American expatriate basketball people in North Macedonia
American expatriate basketball people in the United Kingdom
American men's basketball players
Basketball players from New York (state)
Detroit Pistons players
Maine Celtics players
Maine Red Claws players
Moberly Greyhounds men's basketball players
Newcastle Eagles players
Point guards
Rockets (basketball club) players
Southern Idaho Golden Eagles men's basketball players
Sportspeople from Jamestown, New York
Undrafted National Basketball Association players
West Virginia Mountaineers men's basketball players